Physical Education Building/La Crosse State Normal School was the original physical education building at the La Crosse Normal School, now the University of Wisconsin–La Crosse, in La Crosse, Wisconsin. The building was constructed in 1916 and was named Wittich Hall after one of the school's physical education professors, Walter J. Wittich.

It was designed by architects Parkinson & Dockendorff.

References

University and college buildings on the National Register of Historic Places in Wisconsin
Buildings and structures in La Crosse, Wisconsin
University of Wisconsin–La Crosse
School buildings completed in 1916
Gyms in the United States
National Register of Historic Places in La Crosse County, Wisconsin
1916 establishments in Wisconsin